For information on all State University of New York at Brockport sports, see Brockport Golden Eagles

The Brockport Golden Eagles football program is the intercollegiate American football team for the State University of New York at Brockport located in the U.S. state of New York. The team competes in the NCAA Division III and are members of the Empire 8. The team plays its home games at the 10,000 seat Eunice Kennedy Shriver Stadium in Brockport, New York. The Golden Eagles are coached by Jason Mangone. Brockport participates yearly in the Courage Bowl.

History
Brockport Golden Eagles football began in 1947 after the end of WWII, when veterans returning from the war began to attend the college on the GI Bill. Many of these young people had gone off to the war right after high school or during high school and wanted to have a true college experience complete with athletic teams. The first football team included center Louis F. Avino, who also came up with the team's Golden Eagles mascot. The team was led by Robert Boozer who went on to a long career as an educator and coach at Brockport, the athletic field at Special Olympic Stadium was named Bob Boozer Field in his honor in 2006. The original locker room was a cold room located under the stairwell in Heartwell Hall. Brockport made it to the NCAA DIII postseason for the first time in school history in 2000 and went four consecutive times under coach Salomone's lead.
In 2002, Brockport made it all the way to the NCAA quarterfinals before losing to John Carroll in overtime. After a 15 year drought, the Golden Eagles qualified for the 2017 NCAA Playoffs following an undefeated regular season. In 2018 the Golden Eagles would once again go undefeated in the regular season and qualify for the 2018 NCAA Division III Playoffs. The 2019 Season the Golden Eagles would once again find their way to the 2019 NCAA Division III football season  playoffs with a win against Western New England and advance to play Muhlenberg. In 2021 the Golden Eagles earned a ECAC Bid to play in the Clayton Chapman Bowl. They played Washington & Jefferson Presidents on November 20, 2021. They came away from that game with a 20–7 victory.

Notable former players
Notable alumni include:

 Bob Casullo, assistant coach, Oakland Raiders, New York Jets, Seattle Seahawks, Tampa Bay Buccaneers (2000–2008) 
 Mike Jones, linebacker, Buffalo Bills (1987) 
 Josh Warner, center, Chicago Bears (2002–2003) 
 Jay Johnson, linebacker, Rhein Fire (2003) 
 Justus Galac, strength and conditioning coach, New York Jets (2012–2020) 
 Scott Kaniecki, defensive assistant, Cleveland Browns (2018) 
 Jordan Hogan, coaching assistant, Arizona Cardinals (2021)

Year-by-year results
Statistics correct as of the end of the 2021 college football season

Championships

Conference championships

References

"Yockel, Joseph. "The Birth of Brockport Football: The Robert Ellsworth Boozer Years", The Spectrum: A Scholars Day Journal, Volume 1 Article 11, 2012

External links